Persatuan Sepakbola Indonesia Kendal, commonly known as Persik Kendal is an Indonesian football club based in Kendal, Central Java. They currently compete in the Liga 3.

History
Persik Kendal, has the nickname Bahurekso Warriors, adopted the name of the first regents of Kendal Tumenggung Bahurekso that help Sultan Agung stormed VOC to Batavia. Persik Kendal club playing in Division II Liga Indonesia in the 2006 season.

In the 2007 season Persik Kendal targeting promotion to First Division. Kebondalem Stadium redeveloped into a national-class stadium. At the Copa Dji Sam Soe Indonesia 2007 Persik made history by penetrating the main round of 64 with a face Persib Bandung. Despite failing to advance to round of 32 since losing 1-3 aggregate (0-3 in Bandung and 1-0 in Kendal), but Persik made history by defeating Persib in the second leg on June 7, 2007, 1-0 through goals Taryono in minutes to-70. In Second Division competition, Persik Kendal certainly advance to the round of 16, was ranked first with Group III-A.

Stadium
Persik stadium named Kebondalem Stadium. Its location was in downtown Kendal, Central Java.

Coaching Staff

Honours
 Liga 3
 Runners-up: 2017

References

External links
 
 
 Persik Kendal at Liga-Indonesia.co.id

Football clubs in Central Java
Football clubs in Indonesia
Association football clubs established in 1970
1970 establishments in Indonesia